Atalanta B.C. continued to be a midfield team in a competitive Serie A season, in which it dropped two places in spite of recording more points than during its 7th placed season the year before. Cristiano Doni was the most influential player, the playmaker scoring 16 goals, and surprisingly stayed on at Atalanta for a further season. Luciano Zauri also got his breakthrough, earning his first national team cap during the course of the season.

Squad

Goalkeepers
  Massimo Taibi
  Alex Calderoni
  Davide Pinato

Defenders
  Gianpaolo Bellini
  Massimo Carrera
  Gianluca Falsini
  Paolo Foglio
  Cesare Natali
  Massimo Paganin
  Fabio Rustico
  Luigi Sala
  Damiano Zenoni

Midfielders
  Daniele Berretta
  Yuri Breviaro
  Luca Cavalli
  Ousmane Dabo
  Cristiano Doni
  Vinicio Espinal
  Pierluigi Orlandini
  Alex Pinardi
  Luciano Zauri
  Fabiano

Attackers
  Rolando Bianchi
  Corrado Colombo
  Gianni Comandini
  Piá
  Fausto Rossini
  Luca Saudati
  Alessandro Rinaldi

Serie A

League table

Matches

 Bologna-Atalanta 1-0
 1-0 Giuseppe Signori (19)
 Atalanta-Juventus 0-2
 0-1 Alessandro Del Piero (9)
 0-2 David Trezeguet (83)
 Fiorentina-Atalanta 3-1
 1-0 Nuno Gomes (2)
 1-1 Alessandro Rinaldi (3)
 2-1 Enrico Chiesa (12)
 3-1 Enrico Chiesa (82)
 Atalanta-Verona 1-0
 1-0 Cristiano Doni (27)
 Brescia-Atalanta 3-3
 1-0 Roberto Baggio (24)
 1-1 Luigi Sala (27)
 1-2 Cristiano Doni (29)
 1-3 Gianni Comandini (45)
 2-3 Roberto Baggio (75)
 3-3 Roberto Baggio (90)
 Lazio-Atalanta 2-0
 1-0 Claudio López (42)
 2-0 Fernando Couto (71)
 Atalanta-Udinese 1-5
 0-1 Martin Jørgensen (5)
 1-1 Cristiano Doni (57)
 1-2 Martin Jørgensen (62)
 1-3 Vincenzo Iaquinta (77)
 1-4 Roberto Muzzi (81 pen)
 1-5 Roberto Muzzi (85)
 Lecce-Atalanta 0-2
 0-1 Fausto Rossini (3)
 0-2 Cristiano Doni (81)
 Atalanta-Roma 1-1
 0-1 Marcos Assunção (53)
 1-1 Cristiano Doni (74 pen)
 Atalanta-Venezia 1-0
 1-0 Fausto Rossini (29)
 Piacenza-Atalanta 1-2
 1-0 Dario Hübner (7 pen)
 1-1 Cristiano Doni (59)
 1-2 Cristiano Doni (81)
 Atalanta-Inter 2-4
 0-1 Luigi Di Biagio (8)
 1-1 Cristiano Doni (15)
 2-1 Cristiano Doni (21 pen)
 2-2 Christian Vieri (60)
 2-3 Christian Vieri (74 pen)
 2-4 Mohamed Kallon (79)
 Torino-Atalanta 1-2
 1-0 Fabio Galante (13)
 1-1 Cristiano Doni (45)
 1-2 Corrado Colombo (69)
 Atalanta-Parma 4-1
 1-0 Daniele Berretta (23)
 2-0 Luigi Sala (43)
 3-0 Cristiano Doni (57)
 4-0 Gianni Comandini (64)
 4-1 Johan Micoud (66)
 Roma-Atalanta 0-0
 Perugia-Atalanta 2-0
 1-0 Fabio Bazzani (51)
 2-0 Fabio Bazzani (90)
 Atalanta-Chievo 1-2
 1-0 Daniele Berretta (4)
 1-1 Massimo Marazzina (59)
 1-2 Federico Cossato (77)
 Atalanta-Bologna 2-2
 1-0 Cristiano Doni (10 pen)
 2-0 Daniele Berretta (23)
 2-1 Renato Olive (41)
 2-2 Emanuele Brioschi (90)
 Juventus-Atalanta 3-0
 1-0 Alessio Tacchinardi (34)
 2-0 David Trezeguet (39)
 3-0 David Trezeguet (73)
 Atalanta-Fiorentina 2-0
 1-0 Piá (35)
 2-0 Cristiano Doni (75)
 Verona-Atalanta 3-1
 1-0 Vincenzo Italiano (9)
 1-1 Cristiano Doni (35)
 2-1 Adrian Mutu (43 pen)
 3-1 Massimo Oddo (90 pen)
 Atalanta-Brescia 0-0
 Milan-Atalanta 0-0
 Atalanta-Lazio 0-1
 0-1 Karel Poborský (78)
 Udinese-Atalanta 1-2
 0-1 Cristiano Doni (55)
 1-1 Thomas Manfredini (68)
 1-2 Alex Pinardi (90)
 Atalanta-Lecce 2-1
 1-0 Fausto Rossini (24)
 2-0 Alex Pinardi (30)
 2-1 Bruno Cirillo (56)
 Roma-Atalanta 3-1
 1-0 Vincenzo Montella (18)
 2-0 Massimo Carrera (29 og)
 3-0 Vincenzo Montella (68)
 3-1 Cristiano Doni (84)
 Venezia-Atalanta 0-1
 0-1 Fausto Rossini (85)
 Atalanta-Piacenza 1-1
 1-0 Gianni Comandini (45)
 1-1 Giuseppe Cardone (71)
 Inter-Atalanta 1-2
 0-1 Luigi Sala (44)
 1-1 Christian Vieri (47)
 1-2 Daniele Berretta (62)
 Atalanta-Torino 1-1
 1-0 Daniele Berretta (15)
 1-1 José María Franco (50)
 Parma-Atalanta 1-1
 0-1 Gianni Comandini (39 pen)
 1-1 Johan Micoud (90)
 Atalanta-Perugia 2-1
 0-1 Giovanni Tedesco (16)
 1-1 Daniele Berretta (36)
 2-1 Luciano Zauri (68)
 Chievo-Atalanta 2-1
 0-1 Fausto Rossini (53)
 1-1 Bernardo Corradi (58)
 2-1 Federico Cossato (75)

Topscorers
  Cristiano Doni 16
  Daniele Berretta 6
  Fausto Rossini 5
  Luigi Sala 4
  Gianni Comandini 4

References

Sources
  RSSSF - Italy 2001/02

Atalanta B.C. seasons
Atalanta